Rucuma is a former city and bishopric in Roman North Africa, which remains a Latin Catholic titular see.

History 
It was among the cities of sufficient importance in the late Roman province of Africa Proconsularis to become a suffragan bishopric of its capital Carthage's Metropolitan Archbishopric, yet faded so completely, plausibly at the 7th century advent of Islam, that its precisely location, now in northern Tunisia, wasn't identified precisely.

Historically recorded Diocesan bishops were :
 Lucianus, attended the Council of Carthage in 256, called by Saint Cyprian on lapsi ('lapsed' Christians, who accepted forced pagan sacrifices to avoid martyrdom)
 Maximus, who intervened at another Council of Carthage in 646, against the heresy monothelitism.

Titular see 
The diocese was nominally restored in 1933 as titular bishopric of Rucuma (Latin = Curiate Italian) / Rucumen(sis) (Latin adjective).

It has had the following incumbents, of the fitting Episcopal (lowest) rank:
 Jean-Joseph-Léonce Villepelet (2 July 1966 – resigned 10 Dec 1970) as emeritate, previously Bishop of Nantes (France) (1936.08.20 – 1966.07.02); died 1982
 Patrick Fani Chakaipa (15 Oct 1972 – 31 May 1976) as Auxiliary Bishop of Archdiocese of Salisbury (Zimbabwe) (1972.10.15 – 1976.05.31), next Metropolitan Archbishop of Salisbury (1976.05.31 – 1982.06.25), President of Zimbabwe Catholic Bishops’ Conference (1977 – 1984), Metropolitan Archbishop of Harare (Zimbabwe) (1982.06.25 – death 2003.04.08), President of Inter-Regional Meeting of Bishops of Southern Africa (1992–1995)
 John Huston Ricard, Josephites (S.S.J.) (25 May 1984 – 20 Jan 1997), next Auxiliary Bishop of Archdiocese of Baltimore (Maryland, USA) (1984.05.25 – 1997.01.20), Bishop of Roman Catholic Diocese of Pensacola-Tallahassee, (Florida, USA) (1997.01.20 [1997.03.13] – retired 2011.03.11)
 Thomas Maria Renz (29 April 1997 – ...) as Auxiliary Bishop of Rottenburg–Stuttgart (Germany) (1997.04.29 – ...).

See also 
 List of Catholic dioceses in Tunisia

References

Sources and external links 
 GCatholic - (former &) titular see
 Rucuma in Catholic Hierarchy.
 Bibliography
 Pius Bonifacius Gams, Series episcoporum Ecclesiae Catholicae, Leipzig 1931, p. 468
 Stefano Antonio Morcelli, Africa christiana, Volume I, Brescia 1816, p. 263

Catholic titular sees in Africa
Suppressed Roman Catholic dioceses